"Endure and Survive" is the fifth episode of the American post-apocalyptic drama television series The Last of Us. The episode was written by series co-creator Craig Mazin and directed by Jeremy Webb. It was released online on HBO Max and HBO on Demand on February 10, 2023, ahead of its broadcast on HBO on February 12. In the episode, Joel (Pedro Pascal) and Ellie (Bella Ramsey) agree to escape Kansas City, Missouri, with Henry (Lamar Johnson) and his brother Sam (Keivonn Montreal Woodard), who are being hunted by bandit leader Kathleen (Melanie Lynskey) and her second-in-command Perry (Jeffrey Pierce).

The episode was primarily filmed in April 2022. A full set was built in an empty lot in nine weeks for use in an action sequence in the episode. Filmed over four weeks, the sequence used around 70 actors dressed by 70 prosthetics artists. "Endure and Survive" introduced "bloaters", mutated creatures who are significantly larger than most other infected; the costume was built using prosthetics and later emphasized using visual effects. The episode received positive reviews, with praise for its writing, direction, cinematography, and performances of Johnson, Woodard, Lynskey, and Ramsey. It was watched by 11.6 million viewers within three days.

Plot 
After a resistance movement overthrows the government and takes control of Kansas City, Missouri, their leader Kathleen Coghlan (Melanie Lynskey) sets out to find Henry Burrell (Lamar Johnson), who she blames for the death of her brother, Michael. Henry and his brother Sam (Keivonn Montreal Woodard) take refuge with a smuggler, Eldelstein (John Getz). Ten days later, Eldelstein fails to return from a scouting trip and the brothers track down Joel (Pedro Pascal) and Ellie (Bella Ramsey), who they convince to help them escape. Kathleen explains to her second-in-command, Perry (Jeffrey Pierce), that Michael had told her to forgive Henry before his execution, but she vows vengeance anyway, and Perry agrees.

Henry proposes using the abandoned tunnels under the city to avoid Kathleen's followers. Joel hesitantly agrees while Ellie continues to bond with Sam. Henry admits he betrayed Michael to obtain medication for Sam's leukemia. After they leave the tunnels, a sniper pins down the group. Joel kills him, but not before he alerts Kathleen; she shortly arrives with an armed militia. As Kathleen prepares to kill Henry, a damaged truck crashes through the ground and releases a massive crowd of infected, including a heavily mutated host known as a "bloater". Perry is torn apart by the bloater. Joel provides covering fire while Ellie rescues Sam and Henry. Kathleen corners them, only to be ambushed and bitten by a child clicker. The group flee while the infected make their way towards the city.

Later that night at a motel, Henry accepts Joel's invitation to join him and Ellie to Wyoming. Sam shows Ellie an infected bit him during the attack. Ellie spreads her blood on Sam's bite mark, hoping it will cure him. She promises to stay up with him through the night but inadvertently falls asleep. The next morning, Sam, now infected, attacks Ellie; Henry grabs Joel's gun and kills his brother before killing himself. The next day, Joel and Ellie bury them. Ellie leaves an apology note on Sam's grave, and she and Joel continue their journey west.

Production

Conception and writing 

"Endure and Survive" was written by Craig Mazin and directed by Jeremy Webb. The Directors Guild of Canada revealed Webb was assigned to direct for the series in January 2022. Rotten Tomatoes revealed the episode's title in January 2023. The Last of Us series co-creators Mazin and Neil Druckmann, who wrote and co-directed the video game, found the differing perspectives of the television series granted an opportunity to explore the backstory of Kansas City—a replacement of Pittsburgh from the video game on which the series is based—and show the stories behind the violence, the aftermath of which Joel and Ellie discover in the game. The writers wanted to honor the game's unseen character of Ish—who built a community in tunnels underneath the city—but found they could not properly depict it in the episode, opting for brief references. Mazin felt a standalone episode focusing on Ish may have worked but found environmental storytelling more effective. The writers understood the game's sniper sequence would have translated poorly to television and chose to make the shooter an old man to add a sadness to the scene. While in a meeting with Druckmann and Webb in Santa Monica, California, Mazin realized the full action sequence would be more effective at night—as opposed to day like the game—as its visuals and the creepiness of infected would be improved. The episode's credits use the song "Fuel to Fire" by Agnes Obel.

Casting and characters 
Johnson and Woodard's casting as Henry and Sam was announced in August 2021. Johnson recalled his casting process occurred quickly: he sent his audition tape on Monday, received the role by Wednesday, and departed for the set by Saturday; by the following Wednesday, he started filming his scenes. He had played the game and wanted to avoid imitating the original performance, noting it had impacted him when playing. He was nervous about the role due to the character's importance in the games, but found his nervousness prompted him to challenge himself. Mazin provided information to Johnson regarding Henry's backstory to help him understand the character. Johnson felt Henry was hurt by his own actions against Michael, but Sam was ultimately more important to him. Mazin and Druckmann had several long discussions regarding Henry's fate and considered many alternatives, but ultimately considered his suicide, like in the game, reflected that he had nothing left after Sam's death. Johnson found the scene emotionally draining due to his relationship with Woodard; he "tried to be as present as authentic as possible" as he considered it the most important and iconic scene of the characters, and felt Pascal did the same opposite him. He was allowed to experiment with the scene, including performing lines similar to the game; he wanted to portray Henry's shock and confusion at the sudden events. Johnson considered Henry's final decision was to join his brother, as he felt the brothers had likely been religious their entire lives. He recalled crying behind the camera with Webb during Ellie's final scene with Sam.

Ramsey felt Sam brought out Ellie's childlike energy, which she largely attributed to Woodard. Mazin wrote Sam as deaf—a change from the game—to avoid his relationship with Henry feeling repetitious of Ellie's with Joel, which he felt would have been emphasized due to the different perspectives of the series. He had been watching the television series This Close (2018–2019)—which follows two deaf characters—and felt it may have influenced his decision. He found it automatically introduced intimacy to the scenes due to their quietness, which constrasted with Ellie's talkative nature. Druckmann was instantly drawn to the idea and wished he had included it in the game. Mazin hired This Close co-creator Shoshannah Stern to review the scripts. The production team faced difficulties in casting Sam; they were met with minimal candidates. In February 2021, Mazin distributed a casting call for a boy aged 8–14 who is deaf, black, and proficient in American Sign Language (ASL) or Black American Sign Language; Deaf West Theatre confirmed this was for the character of Sam. He had expected to receive around 80 auditions, but ultimately got about five, including Woodard; it was his first acting role.

Mazin felt Sam's leukemia was a more significant part of his story than his deafness. CJ Jones, whom Mazin met through Stern, acted as Woodard's liaison to the crew and helped teach ASL to cast and crew; Johnson began learning the language via Zoom shortly after arriving in Calgary, and spent his time away from set learning the language. He did not want viewers to think his knowledge of the language was fake, and considered his performance important for deaf representation. He felt spending time around Woodard for production gave him a better grasp on the language; Woodard would sometimes correct his mistakes in scenes. Ramsey similarly learned ASL during production. Sam's age was reduced from the game to allow him to look up to Ellie; Mazin felt this justified his revelation of his bite to Ellie, which does not occur in the game. In portraying Sam's bravery, Woodard recalled his own experiences of being told to stay brave after his father died. Johnson and Woodard worked on the series for two-and-a-half months.

Mazin and Druckmann did not want characters like Kathleen to feel like non-player characters from a video game, opting to give them full stories to humanize them and justify their actions. They felt adding a connection between Kathleen and Henry—and, by extension, to Joel and Ellie—made the storylines more effective and justified the different perspectives. Mazin wanted Kathleen's death to represent the notion of violent actions meeting violent ends, and Druckmann felt her obsession with justice led her to become distracted from her own survival. Lynskey knew of Kathleen's fate when she accepted the role. She found the scene easy to film due to the coordination of the team, as they had been planning for weeks. Mazin found Kathleen being killed by a child important, as minutes earlier she had told Henry that children die all the time. Lynskey recorded her death sounds as automated dialogue replacement; Mazin and Druckmann directed her to "sound like someone was ripping your throat out". Pierce felt Perry was in love with Kathleen, which prompted several of his actions. He found Perry's sacrifice reflected his constant wish to be a hero, and considered it selfless as it was to allow Kathleen to escape. Mazin had told him earlier that he was "gonna get the best death of the entire season". Pierce played the role akin to a rōnin from an Akira Kurosawa film and found his death was an honorable "samurai death" sacrificing himself for the woman he loves.

Filming 

"Endure and Survive" was primarily filmed in April 2022, shortly before production finished on the season finale. Eben Bolter worked as cinematographer for the episode. Lamar Johnson and Woodard were on set in Calgary on March 23, 2022. The classroom and tunnels were built in the cellar underneath an old brewery in Calgary; production designer John Paino and his team enjoyed the "kind of dankness" it had. The team mapped the room with laser scanning to allow the visual effects team to extend the hallways. Production took place around the Calgary Courts Centre and Victoria Park in May. Pascal and Ramsey were spotted on set in Calgary in May, followed some days later by military vehicles representing FEDRA.

The action sequence took significant planning—Bolter estimated around 80 percent of planning for the episode focused on the scene—and it was filmed in four weeks, about a week-and-a-half of which was dedicated to the infected horde rising from the ground. The sequence was one of the few in the series to be prepared on a storyboard due to the combination of elements like pyrotechnics and visual effects, which presented potential dangers. The neighborhood in the sequence was completely built in an empty lot near the Calgary Film Centre as the scenes required significant special effects and the team wanted full control. Modelers crafted to-scale versions of the area based on Lidar scans of Kansas City, and the game and real neighborhoods in Kansas City were used as references. The nine-week building process, led by Paino, art director Don Macaulay, and construction coordinator Donadino Valentino Centanni, involved crafting asphalt driveways, paving gravel, arranging damaged vehicles, and constructing the front and sides of thirteen houses; they engaged several housebuilders for construction. The sniper's three-story building was modeled after Edward Hopper's painting House by the Railroad and the Bates residence from Psycho (1960). The interior was aged for two weeks with water, and Calgary's snow and ice added more water damage, which Paino appreciated.

Webb cited Saving Private Ryan (1998) as inspiration for some of the shots during the sequence, particularly from Joel's perspective in the house or Ellie's on the street. A camera with a sniper scope was used for Joel, and three handheld cameras were used to track the action sequence from the ground, with long lenses "to compress the space, to make it feel scary and cinematic and real". The shots of the truck crashing into the house and the subsequent explosion could only be filmed once. Bolter faced difficulty lighting the sequence. Street lights located two blocks away were switched off to allow Bolter to fully craft the lighting. He took inspiration from stadiums by surrounding the set with backlights and lighting from above with ambient light. Troy Baker, who portrayed Joel in the video games and James in the television series, visited the set while he was in the city for a convention. The ending scenes at the motel were filmed in Nanton, Alberta. The episode completed production in the early hours of June 11, marking the final day of principal photography for the season, two days later than originally scheduled.

Prosthetics and visual effects 
Barrie and Sarah Gower led the prosthetics teams for the series. Around 60 actors were used in the infected mob, and 10 to 15 wore clicker masks, all crafted by 70 prosthetic artists; they applied prosthetics to about 30 people in each three-hour shift. The makeup process began around 3:00 p.m. to prepare for shooting, which began at 9:00 p.m. Due to the amount of infected in the episode, the production team worked with Terry Notary to coordinate their movements; he set up a boot camp to prepare the actors for the role. The bloater was portrayed by actor Adam Basil, with whom Barrie Gower had worked on Game of Thrones. A cast of Basil's body was created to help create the bloater. The  suit was coated in an gel-like liquid during filming to appear wet and reflective. The team wanted the creature to have a "practical presence" for interaction on set, which could later be emphasized with visual effects; the bloater was made taller and given additional muscle definition.

The child clicker—designed by Naughty Dog artist Hyoung Taek Nam, who originally designed clickers for the game—was portrayed by a young contortionist actress, Skye Belle Cowton; prosthetics and visual effects were combined to make the creature. Mazin insisted Cowton wear a Blue's Clues shirt to contrast the innocence and horror. The visual effects team consulted with Mazin and Druckmann to emphasize her childlike features, adding pigtails and showing more of her face. Sixteen visual effects teams worked on the action sequence; while the season averaged 250 visual effects shots per episode, "Endure and Survive" had around 350 to 400. Wētā FX created the visual effects of the infected; 50 to 70 infected were added to the horde through visual effects. Mazin compared the infected emerging from the ground to an ant colony, as well as a scene of goblins in the mines in The Lord of the Rings: The Fellowship of the Ring (2001), which he considered terrifying. The writers spent months trying to decide whether or not to include a bloater in the series before ultimately adding it. Mazin wrote the bloater tore Perry in two at the waist, though Druckmann wanted his death to be more grounded; as Wētā FX worked on the scene, Mazin realized decapitation looked more realistic, and paid homage to the games.

Reception

Broadcast and ratings 
The episode was released online on HBO Max and HBO on Demand on February 10, 2023, ahead of its broadcast on television to avoid conflicting with Super Bowl LVII. It aired on HBO in its weekly slot on February 12. The episode had 11.6 million viewers in the United States on its first weekend, including linear viewers and streams on HBO Max. On linear television, it had 382,000 viewers, with a 0.09 ratings share.

Critical response 

On review aggregator Rotten Tomatoes, "Endure and Survive" has an approval rating of 94 percent based on 34 reviews, with an average rating of 9/10. The website's critical consensus called the episode "a sobering reminder of how unsparing this apocalyptic world can be".

The performances of Johnson, Woodard, Lynskey, and Ramsey received particular praise. TVLine named Johnson an honorable mention for Performer of the Week; IGNs Cardy lauded his emotional performance in his final scene, and Total Films Bradley Russell felt the naivety of Woodard's role intensified the narrative. Den of Geeks Bernard Boo called Ramsey's reaction to Henry's death "utterly heartbreaking", and Russell found her performance throughout the episode made the moment more effective, and was ultimately worthy of awards consideration. Boo thought Lynskey and Pierce's performances effectively conveyed Perry's devotion to Kathleen. The A.V. Clubs Cote found Lynskey's delivery "edges dangerously close to end-times camp".

Reviewers lauded Mazin's writing. IndieWires Ben Travers called the episode "a potent examination of heroes and villains". The Escapists Darren Mooney found it "surprisingly literary", citing the imagery of the rising infected being built thematically beforehand, and found the zombie apocalypse tropes were employed more elegantly than in the show's first and second episodes. Total Films Russell considered some moments—like Henry painting Sam's face—just as powerful as the show's acclaimed third episode, but found Kathleen's death underwhelming. Digital Spys Janet A. Leigh found the episode's deaths pointless, noting Henry and Sam were not given enough meaningful scenes and questioning Kathleen's inclusion if only to kill her abruptly. Radio Timess Liam O'Dell criticized the episode's deaf representation and felt the writers made Sam deaf to manipulate emotions and depict Henry as a savior.

Rolling Stones Alan Sepinwall praised the action sequences for remaining character-driven, and Kotakus Jackson thought the pacing of the sniper scene made it more effective than the game. Game Rants Rabab Khan wrote the cinematography captured the tension during the sniper sequence, and the changing shots effectively represented the horror of the subsequent action scenes. IGNs Simon Cardy found the cinematography in the action sequence reflected the intense atmosphere and the cuts from close-ups to wide shots emphasized the terror and scale. The A.V. Clubs David Cote lauded the production design, and Kotakus Claire Jackson praised the sound design of the sniper. Den of Geeks Boo found the action entertaining enough to forgive the lack of character development earlier in the episode; Push Squares Aaron Bayne similarly felt the Kansas City scenes were less memorable and frightening than the game's Pittsburgh. Slant Magazines Pat Brown found the action sequence insufficiently tense as the episode failed to "build the undead up as objects of real dread". Polygons Pete Volk criticized it for its low lighting and the bloater for its weightlessness and lack of presence in the world, comparing it to the child clicker which he found effective due to its inhuman movements. Mashables Belen Edwards praised Cowton's performance and movements as the child clicker.

Notes

References

External links 

2023 American television episodes
Deaf culture in the United States
Fratricide in fiction
Murder–suicide in television
Television episodes about cancer
Television episodes about disability
Television episodes about revenge
Television episodes set in Missouri
Television episodes written by Craig Mazin
The Last of Us (TV series) episodes